The following are the national records in athletics in Bulgaria maintained by the Bulgarian Athletic Federation (BFLA).

Outdoor

Key to tables:

+ = en route to a longer distance

h = hand timing

OT = oversized track (> 200m in circumference)

Men

Women

Indoor

Men

Women

References
General
 Bulgarian Athletics Records - Men Outdoor 20 September 2020 updated
 Bulgarian Athletics Records - Women Outdoor
 Bulgarian Athletics Records - Men Indoor
 Bulgarian Athletics Records - Women Indoor
Specific

External links
 BFLA web site

Bulgaria
Records
Athletics
Athletics